Alastor korbi is a species of wasp in the family Vespidae.

References

korbi